The Greyhound Bus Terminal in downtown Evansville, Indiana, also known as the Greyhound Bus Station, is a Streamline Moderne-style building from 1938.  It was built at a cost of $150,000.  Its architects include W.S. Arrasmith who designed numerous other Greyhound depots. The terminal, at the corner of Third and Sycamore streets, was listed on the National Register of Historic Places in 1979.

In July 2008, the long-unused bus terminal and its site had been considered in discussions about potential locations for a new arena that would replace Roberts Municipal Stadium. By December, city council approved plans to build the Ford Center in another downtown location.

In December 2011, then Mayor Jonathan Weinzapfel announced plans to turn the adjacent property into Bicentennial Park to celebrate the city's upcoming bicentennial in 2012.

In 2016, a restaurant named Bru Burger opened inside the old terminal.

Gallery

External links
 Student 3D model of the station (with introduction and narration) from the website of the Evansville Vanderburgh Public Library

References

Buildings and structures in Evansville, Indiana
National Register of Historic Places in Evansville, Indiana
Bus stations in Indiana
Transport infrastructure completed in 1938
Greyhound Lines
Bus stations on the National Register of Historic Places
Transportation buildings and structures on the National Register of Historic Places in Indiana
Transportation buildings and structures in Vanderburgh County, Indiana
1938 establishments in Indiana